The 2018 IFMA World Muaythai Championships is the 17th edition of the IFMA World Muaythai Championships. The competition are held from May 10 to May 19, 2019, in Cancún, Mexico.

Medal table

Overall

Elite A

Competitive B

Medalists

Men's events

Women's events

Participating nations
A total of 404 athletes from 77 nations competed.

 (2)
 (1)
 (9)
 (10)
 (1)
 (12)
 (2)
 (5)
 (2)
 (1)
 (15)
 (5)
 (1)
 (8)
 (3)
 (6)
 (2)
 (3)
 (2)
 (1)
 (1)
 (3)
 (3)
 (10)
 (9)
 (2)
 (5)
 (4)
 (1)
 (5)
 (3)
 (5)
 (1)
 (5)
 (7)
 (1)
 (14)
 (2)
 (2)
 (4)
 (3)
 (1)
 (1)
 (25)
 (2)
 (1)
 (1)
 (1)
 (4)
 (1)
 (14)
 (5)
 (4)
 (5)
 (29)
 (5)
 (3)
 (1)
 (1)
 (5)
 (1)
 (19)
 (1)
 (11)
 (1)
 (22)
 (1)
 (17)
 (5)
 (24)
 (2)
 (1)
 (8)

References

External links

IFMA World Muaythai Championships
Muay Thai World Championships
Muay Thai World Championships
Muaythai Championships
2018 in Mexican sports
Sport in Cancún
World Muaythai Championships